NA-149 Multan-II is a constituency for the National Assembly of Pakistan.

Election 2002 

General elections were held on 10 Oct 2002. Malik Liaqat Ali Dogar  of PPP won by 31,085 votes.

Election 2008 

General elections were held on 18 Feb 2008. Javed Hashmi of PML-N won by 70,864 votes.

Election 2013 

General elections were held on 11 May 2013. Javed Hashmi of Pakistan Tehreek-e-Insaf won by 83,640  votes and became the  member of National Assembly.

By-election 2014 
After Javed Hashmi's resignation from National Assembly, by election for this vacant seat were held on 16 October 2014. Javed Hashmi as an Independent candidate with support from PML-N lost to Amir Dogar, also an Independent candidate with Pakistan Tehreek-e-Insaf's backing.

Election 2018

By-election 2023 
A by-election will be held on 16 March 2023 due to the resignation of Malik Aamir Dogar, the previous MNA from this seat.

See also
NA-148 Multan-I
NA-150 Multan-III

References

External links 
Election result's official website

NA-149